This is a list of the France national football team results from 1921 to 1959.

1920s

1921

1922

1923

1924

1925

1926

1927

1928

1929

1930s

1930

1931

1932

1933

1934

1935

1936

1937

1938

1939

1940s

1940

1942

1944

1945

1946

1947

1948

1949

1950s

1950

1951

1952

1953

1954

1955

1956

1957

1958

1959

External links 
 FFF Match Archive

1920s in France
1930s in France
1940s in France
1950s in France
1900s